Baharuddin Siregar Stadium is a multi-use stadium in Lubuk Pakam, Deli Serdang Regency, North Sumatra, Indonesia.  It is currently used mostly for football matches and is used as the home stadium for PSDS Deli Serdang.  The stadium has a capacity of 15,000 people.

References

Sports venues in Indonesia
Football venues in Indonesia
Buildings and structures in North Sumatra
Sport in North Sumatra